János Frivaldszky (17 June 1822 – 29 March 1895) was a Hungarian entomologist and ornithologist. Nephew of Imre Frivaldszky, he succeeded him at the Hungarian Natural History Museum.

Frivaldszky was born in Rajec, Trencsén County, Kingdom of Hungary and introduced to natural history by his uncle Imre Frivaldszky. After studying engineering at the University of Technology he decided to study zoology. He collected specimens and brought them to his uncle and from 1850, he often acted as a substitute for his uncle. Frivaldszky took a special interest in insects and became assistant director of the Hungarian National Museum after the retirement of his uncle. He was especially interested in cave arthropods and beetles.  In later life he studied the birds of Hungary and wrote Aves Hungariae (Magyarország madarai) (1891).

References

External links 
 Frivaldszky János (1822-1895) az entomológus, akadémikus és muzeológus (in Hungarian) 
 Aves Hungariae (1891)

Hungarian zoologists
1822 births
1895 deaths